William Neal Saul (November 19, 1940 – September 12, 2006) was an American football linebacker in the National Football League (NFL) for the Baltimore Colts, Pittsburgh Steelers, New Orleans Saints, and Detroit Lions. He played college football at Penn State University. Saul was the first player to be outfitted with a wireless microphone worn during an NFL game by Jack Newman of NFL Films, the league's in-house filmmaking division.

Early years
Saul attended Butler Senior High School, where he played football, basketball and baseball. He played as a two-way end in football.

He accepted a football scholarship from Penn State University. He was switched from end, to guard, to center. As a senior, he was a backup at center behind Jay Huffman.

He also practiced basketball. In the 1959-60 season, he appeared in 11 games, averaging 6.1 points and 4 rebounds per contest. In the 1960-61 season, he played in one game, posting 2 points and one rebound.

Professional career
Saul was selected by the Baltimore Colts in the second round (23rd overall) of the 1962 NFL Draft. He also was selected by the Buffalo Bills in the ninth round (68th overall) of the 1962 AFL Draft. As a rookie, he was a backup at linebacker and defensive end. In 1963, he focused on the linebacker position and remained a backup as he gained experience.

On September 7, 1964, he was traded along with rookie halfback Marv Woodson to the Pittsburgh Steelers, in exchange for placekicker Lou Michaels and a third round pick (#36-Glenn Ressler).

In 1964, the Steelers acquired Saul after starter Myron Pottios suffered a broken right arm in the last preseason game. He appeared in 13 games with 10 starts. In 1965, he was placed on the injured reserve list, with a kidney injury that he suffered in the preseason game against the Minnesota Vikings. In 1966, he was named the team's starter at middle linebacker. On December 10, 1967, in the contest against the Washington Redskins, he became the first player to wear a wireless microphone during an NFL game.

On July 28, 1969, he was traded to the Dallas Cowboys, in exchange for an undisclosed future draft choice (not exercised). He was released on September 3. On September 4, the New Orleans Saints acquired his rights from the Cowboys, in exchange for an undisclosed amount of cash.

On September 1, 1970, he was released from the Saints roster. In September, he signed as a free agent with the Detroit Lions. He appeared in 13 games as a backup at middle linebacker.

Personal life
Saul was the older brother of NFL players Rich Saul and Ron Saul. He died on September 12, 2006.

References

External links
Video: The First Mic'd Up Player in Football History

1940 births
2006 deaths
People from Butler, Pennsylvania
Sportspeople from the Pittsburgh metropolitan area
Players of American football from Pennsylvania
American football linebackers
Penn State Nittany Lions football players
Baltimore Colts players
Pittsburgh Steelers players
New Orleans Saints players
Detroit Lions players
Basketball players from Pennsylvania
Penn State Nittany Lions basketball players